R.I.D.E. (pronounced "ride") is the third studio album by American country music group Trick Pony. It is the group's only recording for the Asylum-Curb label. The album's name is an abbreviation for "Rebellious Individuals Delivering Entertainment".

This album includes the singles "The Bride", "It's a Heartache", and "Ain't Wastin' Good Whiskey on You". Two of the tracks on this album are cover songs: "It's a Heartache" is a cover of a pop standard which has been recorded by Juice Newton, Lorrie Morgan, Rod Stewart and Bonnie Tyler, whose version was a Top Ten hit on both the Billboard Hot 100 and country charts in 1978, while "Señorita" was previously recorded by Los Lonely Boys on their 2004 self-titled album.

Track listing
"Ain't Wastin' Good Whiskey on You" (Wally Wilson, Buck Moore) – 2:58
background vocals: Tracy Byrd, Joe Diffie, Mel Tillis, Tanya Tucker and Darryl Worley
"What's Not to Love" (Kim Tribble, Ira Dean, David Lee Murphy) – 2:43
electric guitar: Brad Paisley
"It's a Heartache" (Ronnie Scott, Steve Wolfe) – 3:27
"When I Fall" (Billy Dean, Keith Burns) – 3:06
"I Didn't" (Steven J. Williams, Sherrié Austin, Will Rambeaux) – 3:23
"The Bride" (Lee Ann Burgess, Darryl Burgess, Liz Hengber) – 3:00
"Sad City" (Burns, Mark Oliverius) – 3:32
"Stand in the Middle of Texas" (Matraca Berg, Sharon Vaughn) – 3:49
"Señorita" (Joey Garza, Henry Garza, Ringo Garza) – 3:07
"Hillbilly Rich" (Anthony Smith, I. Dean) – 3:04
"Once a Cowboy" (Bret Michaels, Jeffrey Steele, Shane Minor) – 3:48
"Cry, Cry, Cry" (Steele, I. Dean) – 2:42
"I Can Live with That" (Murphy, Tribble, I. Dean) – 4:18
"Maryann's Song" (Heidi Newfield, Todd Woolsey) – 3:38

Personnel

Trick Pony
Keith Burns - acoustic guitar, vocals
Ira Dean - bass guitar, acoustic guitar, vocals
Heidi Newfield - harmonica, vocals

Additional musicians
Larry Beaird - acoustic guitar
Richard Bennett - acoustic guitar, electric guitar
Jim "Moose" Brown - keyboards, organ, piano
Steve Bryant - bass guitar
Pat Buchanan - dobro, electric guitar
Tracy Byrd - background vocals on "Ain't Wastin' Good Whiskey on You"
J.T. Corenflos - electric guitar
Joe Diffie - background vocals on "Ain't Wastin' Good Whiskey on You"
Chris Dunn - trombone
Shannon Forrest - drums
Larry Franklin - fiddle
Paul Franklin - pedal steel guitar, lap steel guitar
Owen Hale - drums
Aubrey Haynie - fiddle
Tommy Harden - drums
Johnny Hiland - electric guitar
Jim Horn - baritone saxophone
Bill Hullet - acoustic guitar
Mike Johnson - pedal steel guitar
John Jorgenson - electric guitar
Troy Lancaster - electric guitar
Chris Leuzinger - electric guitar
Sam Levine - tenor saxophone
Branford Marsalis - tenor saxophone
Chris McHugh - drums
Greg Morrow - drums
Gordon Mote - keyboards, organ, piano, Wurlitzer
Steve Nathan - organ
Brad Paisley - electric guitar on "What Not to Love"
Billy Panda - acoustic guitar
Steve Patrick - trumpet
Darius Rucker - background vocals on "Sad City"
Milton Sledge - drums 
Anthony L. Smith - banjo
Joe Spivey - fiddle
Michael Spriggs - acoustic guitar
Bobby Terry - electric guitar
Mel Tillis - background vocals on "Ain't Wastin' Good Whiskey on You"
Tanya Tucker - background vocals on "Ain't Wastin' Good Whiskey on You"
John Willis - banjo, electric guitar
Darryl Worley - background vocals on "Ain't Wastin' Good Whiskey on You"

Charts

References

2005 albums
Trick Pony albums
Asylum-Curb Records albums